

List of streets in Amsterdam

A
Anjeliersgracht Now named Westerstraat, the street filled-in in 1861.

D
Damrak
De Clercqstraat

E
Elandsgracht

F
Ferdinand Bolstraat

G
Goudsbloemgracht

H
Heiligeweg

J
Jodenbreestraat

K
Kalverstraat
Kromme Waal

L
Lindengracht

M
Markengracht
Marnixstraat is a main street in Amsterdam. A large bus depot and the main police station are located on the street.
Martelaarsgracht

N
Nes (Amsterdam)
Nieuwe Achtergracht
Nieuwendijk, Amsterdam
Nieuwezijds Achterburgwal
Nieuwezijds Voorburgwal

P
P.C. Hooftstraat
Palmgracht
Prins Hendrikkade

R
Raadhuisstraat
Rapenburg (Amsterdam)
Rokin
Rozengracht

S
Sarphatistraat
Scheepstimmermanstraat
Singel
Sint Antoniesbreestraat
Spiegelgracht
Spuistraat

V
Vijzelgracht

W
Warmoesstraat
Westerstraat

Z
Zeedijk
Zomerdijkstraat
Zwanenburgwal

References

Amsterdam-related lists
Streets in Amsterdam